is a Japanese musician and composer.

In the fifth year of elementary school, Hirasawa took up the electric guitar, inspired by the surf and instrumental rock bands he heard on the radio and on TV, later joining his junior high school's band. In 1973 he formed Mandrake, a progressive rock band that incorporated elements from heavy metal and krautrock. Being one of the few Japanese progressive rock bands of its time, Mandrake achieved little success and released no albums during its lifetime.

After discovering punk rock and working on synthesizer-heavy projects, Hirasawa felt that progressive rock became just for entertainment and decided to reform the band as the electronic rock band P-Model in 1979. Originally met with success, they turned to decidedly uncommercial post-punk and experimental rock after Hirasawa went through an adverse reaction to his fame. With Hirasawa at the forefront, the band went through various lineups and achieved some popularity in the Japanese independent music scene.

In 1989, Hirasawa launched his solo career. Unbound by the restraints of a band, his albums were marked by a refusal to stick to any particular genre. He continued to evolve his sound while concurrently working with two different iterations of P-Model until the group was disbanded in 2000. He has actively been releasing new music since.

While Hirasawa is mostly remembered in Japan for the first two P-Model albums, he has achieved international recognition for his soundtrack work, particularly for the adaptations of the Kentaro Miura manga Berserk and the work of anime director Satoshi Kon.

Compositions
Hirasawa's music takes from such concepts as analytical psychology, advances in digital technology, the philosophies of yin and yang, and principles of nature versus machines. As an avid fan of science fiction novels since the 1970s and an eclectic reader overall, he's been inspired by the works of Frank Herbert, Carl Jung, Hayao Kawai, Kenji Miyazawa, George Orwell, Wilhelm Reich, Antoine de Saint-Exupéry, Theodore Sturgeon, Nikola Tesla and Kurt Vonnegut.

A constant source of inspiration for his music has come from Thailand. On a 1994 trip to Phuket, Hirasawa went through a "Thai shock", amazed by the country's culture, namely its transsexual cabaret performers, some of whom he would invite to be singers on his albums and guest performers in his concerts throughout his career. After many trips back to the country Hirasawa grew to be increasingly identified with the transsexual population, incorporating their problems and experiences in society into his work.

On having his music categorized based on western trends, Hirasawa has said:

Performances

For every main solo album he releases, Hirasawa also stages an accompanying "Interactive Live Show", an interactive concert that merges computer graphics with his music to tell a story. The flow of each show is determined by audience participation; for example, Interactive Live Show 2000 Philosopher's Propeller was formatted as a maze, and the audience was asked to choose which direction to go in. Provided with phone numbers to four cellular phones during one song, the audience was allowed to call the numbers to have Hirasawa play the corresponding ringtones. This created an improvised harmony between the background music and the ringing phones. Since 1998, participation has been possible through the internet.

Hirasawa's live music is built on samples he activates with various hand-crafted machines and pre-recorded tracks without vocals. For the Solar Live concerts, he used solar power and a power-generating wheel as the source of energy for his electronic equipment.

Hirasawa has worked since the start of his solo career to decrease the amount of performers around himself. Most of his solo albums from 1992 onwards feature no guest musicians, and live backing bands were relinquished in 1994. Since then, only a few select shows have had guest singers or backing instrumentalists.

Equipment usage
One of Hirasawa's defining factors that set him apart from other Japanese electronic artists is ever-changing production techniques and gear of choice.

Guitars
Hirasawa has favored guitars designed specifically by Japanese instrument manufacturers. With a movement in the early '80s of electric guitar makers moving away from mass-producing copies of foreign designs and towards original ones, Hirasawa played many unique models. Over a five-year period, from Mandrake's last days to the early P-Model phase, he used the H.S. Anderson Rider, Fernandes Art Wave and ESP Random Star, painting them in bright colors (burgundy, yellow, blue and white). In 1983 he settled on Tōkai Gakki's  aluminum guitars as his main ones, attracted by their unique material and design. He used multiple Tōkai Talbos over an eleven-year period, with the guitar becoming an integral part of his image.

After Tōkai discontinued production and customer support for the Talbo due to financial difficulties in the mid-'90s, Hirasawa requested Fernandes to make him a guitar of his design in 1994 called PHOTON, a Talbo-shaped guitar with a wooden body. In 2004, he requested TALBO Secret FACTORY, a manufacturer of Talbos run by other musicians who also liked the guitar and wanted to continue to use it, to build a Talbo of his own design, called ICE-9 (named after the material of the same name from Kurt Vonnegut's novel Cat's Cradle). It became Hirasawa's main guitar for the next eight years. To showcase it, he made an eponymous mini-album in 2005.

Hirasawa has continued to work with the TALBO Secret FACTORY, requesting the conversion of one of his early Tōkai models into a new design of his, the ASTRO, in 2011 and asking for the renewal of the PHOTON with new specifications after two decades of usage. In 2012, Secret FACTORY co-founder HISASHI gifted him a Talbo of his own design, the EVO 0101Z, which Hirasawa adopted as his new main guitar, owning standard copies as well as two equipped with single coil guitar pickups for selective usage.

Besides those, Hirasawa has also used different types of guitar for specific purposes, playing MIDI guitars like the Ibanez X-ING IMG-2010 and Casio MG500, various acoustic and classical models, classic surf ones like the Mosrite and the Jaguar, and the Aria AS-100C/SPL silent guitar.

Electronics
Hirasawa has used Amiga computers extensively in his work, starting out with CG production in 1987, and later on applying it on his albums and live shows, using applications such as Say, SCALA, Bars & Pipes, SuperJAM! and OctaMED. He stopped using Amigas with the LIMBO-54 shows of 2003 and the Byakkoya/Paprika albums of 2006, since "maintaining an Amiga now is, like maintaining a classic car, costly".

In the '90s he started a gradual transition to Microsoft Windows (later on dabbling in Ubuntu for a time), using programs such as Delay Lama, Vocaloids, Bars'n'Pipes (an unofficial continuation of the Amiga program), Cakewalk Sonar and Synth1.

When choosing string tones Hirasawa aims to find ones with unstable pitches and a "dark sound", which he finds harmonious, such as the Mellotron, Kurzweil synths and EASTWEST's line of Symphonic sounds.

Recording/production
In the '90s, Hirasawa gradually moved his work from professional facilities to home, dubbing his workspace on various residences "Studio WIRESELF". He finally moved completely to it by the recording of 2000's Philosopher's Propeller. The following year he undertook the sustainable energy project "Hirasawa Energy Works" and changed his lifestyle so that all his music would be recorded with solar energy. To reduce carbon emission, Studio WIRESELF was outfitted to be powered completely by a photovoltaic system of 2 solar panels, with 2 car batteries to store extra energy. Years later, Hirasawa added 2 more panels to the studio and retired the batteries.

Initially Studio WIRESELF operated on large pieces of equipment, both analog and digital. With the advances of technology and the streamlining of production under Hirasawa Energy Works, the working landscape transitioned to software synthesizers, with the physical elements of the studio reduced to one recording booth and two workstations, one for Hirasawa and the other for engineer Masanori Chinzei.

Activism and charity
All proceeds were donated to the  volunteering welfare facility for the mentally ill in Gunma Prefecture, founded by the psychologist who gave Hirasawa counseling around the time he made the P-Model albums Scuba and Karkador.

In 2001, a pregnant stray cat appeared in Hirasawa's studio. He took care of her and helped carry out four of her pregnancies from 2001 to 2002. Since he could not take care of all the kittens, Hirasawa created a temporary site to recruit possible adopters and keep up with the welfare of the various cats.

As Hirasawa objected to the American response after the September 11 attacks, which he believes involved excessive carnage, and the Japanese government's aiding of such actions, he offered downloads of online banners and two of his songs for free, which he hoped would be used as tools of objection. One of them is a rerecording of 1994's "Love Song", which is about children in the battlefield; the other is "High-Minded Castle", about a man who "can not know the truth and true background through media, he tries to face the real tragedy on the other side of the world". The latter was taken from the Blue Limbo album, which displays a dystopian theme partly influenced by the American government's retaliation.

To support freelance journalists, independent and citizen media, Hirasawa started a free music archive to be used by independent news as background music. He sent e-mails to various associates and members of P-Model requesting involvement, the only one to join was guitarist PEVO 1go. The files uploaded were instrumental mixes of songs by both musicians, including some from Vistoron, whose concept revolves around the propagation of a false reality by mass media.

In the aftermath of the 2011 Tōhoku earthquake and tsunami and the Fukushima Daiichi nuclear disaster, Hirasawa started traveling around the country with a Geiger counter, measuring the radiation levels and reporting them in his Twitter account. In June 2011, a song was posted on his site, titled : A rerecording of the P-Model song "Boat" (from 1984's Scuba) in the style of "The Aggregated Past – Kangen Shugi 8760 Hours" project, with the lyrics changed to protest against Japan's use of nuclear power and to criticize the government and the media. The song, credited to "Stealthman", was only available on the site for six days, but could be redistributed if unaltered and not for profit. An instrumental mix was posted on the site by Hirasawa after the original was taken down, following the same distribution guidelines. As these events occurred, Hirasawa told a story on Twitter of being assaulted and having his computer and website hacked by "Stealthman". Through his tweets and the way the posts were worded on his website, Hirasawa effectively distanced himself from the track and disowned it. The song is available on the karaoke service provider Xing's  online song library, credited to "Stealthman".

Personal life
Hirasawa has an older brother, artist , who goes by the moniker "YOU1". He formed a stage effects team to give Mandrake shows visual flair and appeared on the band's last show, running on a treadmill. Yūichi was P-Model's art director for the band's first 9 years of existence, and has done occasional artwork for his brother from 2013 onwards. His only musical credits are for writing the lyrics of "For Kids" and "Sunshine City" (from In a Model Room), and for doing backing vocals on "Rocket" (from The Ghost in Science).

In 2013, Yūichi opened the  Gazio in Tsukuba. Although branded as a "new wave" café, the establishment was heavily themed around P-Model and Susumu: it was adorned with various band related memorabilia, served original cocktails titled after his songs and often held special events and shows by members and associates of the band; Susumu made exclusive content for it and, as he gives his brother most things he has no need for at a given moment, many studio and stage objects were displayed in the café. Gazio ceased operations as an active restaurant in 2015 and rebranded as an art studio; Yūichi now holds twice monthly "Café Gazio" events in Kichijōji.

Their father, was a firefighter as well as a calligrapher: Under the penname , he wrote the names of album and band for the cover art of the P-Model album Potpourri.

Since childhood, Hirasawa showed a love for machines, and thought of himself as an engineer. He was a RC plane enthusiast (at one point in time wanting to be a pilot) and repaired broken devices (such as radios and flashlights) given to him by his parents. He also had motocross as a hobby for a time.

According to the Tokyo Designers' Gakuin College '75 Design Annual, his graduation project was a dome-shaped stage set hall for Tangerine Dream shows.

During the early days of Mandrake, he worked as a part-time carrier on a fruits and vegetables market during the morning and at a Pepsi warehouse during the night, alongside Mandrake co-founder Fumiyasu Abe. In 1978, Hirasawa applied for a part-time lecturer position at Yamaha Music Foundation, and since he was the only person that applied for that position, he got the job. He taught courses at the Yamaha Synthesizer School until 1983, and met various musicians that he would later collaborate with through these lectures. After leaving his position as teacher, he took to making commercial jingle for the rest of the decade to make ends meet.

Hirasawa started smoking in 1979 and quit in 2001; he has since become an avid vaper. He's also a teetotaler, since drinking anything larger than a fifth of a cup of beer makes him feel like his head is exploding. Regardless of that, he used to drink small amounts of wine during recording sessions to preserve his voice, which he's since replaced with throat lozenges.

Hirasawa has spoken out in favor of the Big Pharma conspiracy theory. He has been known to promote the usage of alternative medicine, including the widely discredited Miracle Mineral Solution, and has posted on Twitter extensively about his experiences with acupuncture and moxibustion.

A vegetarian, Hirasawa doesn't eat meat, remarking, "At any rate, meat is unappetizing and gross. Eating meat makes me tired and makes me throw up". He lives in a house in Tsukuba with his pet calico cat . The house also has a garden, where he grows some of his food; he also cultivates bacteria to make yogurt out of soy milk.

While repeatedly incorporating various concepts from Shintoism and Buddhism in his themes, as well as ones from other Asian religions, Hirasawa has never specified what his beliefs are. However, at one point in time, he supported the return of the imperial cult of the Emperor of Japan as a psychological measure: "I think His Majesty needs to recover his glorification. In this matter, I’m sort of right wing; the Emperor of Japan needs to regain his symbolic position as a God. But this is for the sake of a healthy process of collective consciousness, so please don't lump my position in with all the militaristic talk".

Discography

Studio albums

Virtual Rabbit (1991)
Aurora (1994)
Sim City (1995)
Siren (1996)

Blue Limbo (2003)

Beacon (2021)

As Kaku P-Model
Vistoron (2004)
Gipnoza (2013)

Soundtracks

Model House Works (assorted adverts, 1985)
Detonator Orgun (anime, 1991-1992)
Glory Wars (light novels, 1993)

Lost Legend (theme park stage show, 1999)

AmigaOS 4 (operating system, 2004)

Opus (anime)

Publications
Landsale – Record Copy Full Score (with Yasumi Tanaka & Katsuhiko Akiyama). Ongaku Shunjū, 1980
P-Model. I3 Promotion, 1992
 – P-model no kako ha ikaga?. Sankakuyama Tsūshin (independent fan club), 1995 (collection of press clippings & flyers, 1973-1993)
 (by Kasiko Takahasi). Chaos Union & SoftBank Publishing, 1999 (2 volumes & 1 CD-ROM)
P-Model Side – Open Source
Hirasawa Side – 
Rev.2.0 (revised & expanded reissue). Fascination & Book-ing, 2005
Rev.2.4 v2010 (revised & expanded digital reissue). Chaos Union & Fascination, 2010 (available as both a limited pressing of 1000 physical DVD-ROMs and as download)
SP-2 . Chaos Union & Teslakite, 2008 (mix of photography & essays)
. Chaos Union & Fascination (material originally posted on FAMIGA from December 1998 to March 2002), 2012
Newsletters
Moire Club. Model House, 1985–1989 (12 volumes)
Hirasawa Bypass. I3 Promotion, 1989–1996 (19 volumes)
Green Nerve. Chaos Union & Teslakite, 1997–present (37 volumes)
Special releases
Another Papers. Model House & Personal Pulse, 1983
 two 16-page booklets:  & . DIW (Disk Union) & SYUN, 1994
tokyo paranesian. I3 Promotion, 1994
Sim City Photographs. I3 Promotion, 1995
Interactive Live Show Vol.5. Hirasawa Bypass (I3 Promotion), 1996
p-model 1996. Hirasawa Bypass (I3 Promotion), 1996
Day Scanner of Susumu Hirasawa. Chaos Union & Teslakite, 1997
. Chaos Union & Marquee, 1997 (2 volumes)
World Cell – History of Interactive Live Show. Chaos Union & Teslakite, 1998
A Young Person's Guide to Mandrake 1973–1978. Chaos Union & Mecano, 2006
Live Byakkoya. Chaos Union & Teslakite, 2006

See also 
 List of ambient music artists

References
Notes

Citations

Bibliography

 .
 .

External links
 
 平沢進　Susumu Hirasawa (P-MODEL)　Official site (current website)
 NO ROOM – The official site of Susumu Hirasawa (P-MODEL) (semi-deactivated site)
 / (defunct personal sites)
 Twitter account 
 Susumu Hirasawa iTunes Japan page (Universal) 
 SUSUMU HIRASAWA iTunes Japan page (Columbia) 
 
 

1954 births
Ambient musicians
Anime composers
Inventors of musical instruments
Japanese film score composers
Japanese guitarists
Japanese keyboardists
Japanese male composers
Japanese male film score composers
Japanese male singer-songwriters
Japanese singer-songwriters
Japanese multi-instrumentalists
Japanese music arrangers
Japanese record producers
Japanese rock musicians
Japanese songwriters
Japanese synth-pop musicians
Japanese techno musicians
Japanese trance musicians
Living people
New-age musicians
New wave musicians
Nippon Columbia artists
Polydor Records artists
Post-punk musicians
Progressive rock musicians
Singers from Tokyo
Video game composers
Vocaloid musicians
World music musicians